A work unit or danwei is the name given to a place of employment in the People's Republic of China. The term danwei remains in use today, as people still use it to refer to their workplace. However, it is more appropriate to use danwei to refer to a place of employment during the period when the Chinese economy was not as developed and more heavily reliant on welfare for access to long-term urban workers or when used in the context of state-owned enterprises. Prior to Deng Xiaoping's economic reforms, a work unit acted as the first step of a multi-tiered hierarchy linking each individual with the central Communist Party infrastructure. Work units were the principal method of implementing party policy. The work unit provided lifetime employment and extensive socioeconomic welfare -- "a significant feature of socialism and a historic right won through the Chinese Revolution."

Danwei system 
Institutions such as industrial factories, schools and hospitals, and government departments are all part of the danwei system. Among them, the heavy industrial work units, commonly viewed as the prototype of the socialist workplace, were granted priority for resources. During the Maoist era, the work unit served as multifunctional urban institutions that encompassed various aspects of urban livelihoods. Each danwei created their own housing, child care, schools, clinics, shops, services, post offices, etc. Workers' benefits were only partly in the form of wages, which significant benefits coming in the form of state-provided services and the like. Therefore, work units provided essential social resources to its members when the market economy had not yet fully developed. The industrial danwei was a state institution.

Amongst other things, the work unit assigned individuals living quarters and provided them with food, which was eaten in centralized canteens. The danwei system was crucial to the implementation of the one child policy as the reproductive behavior of workers could be monitored through the danwei system. Workers not complying with policy could have their pay docked, incentives withheld or living conditions downgraded.

The increasing liberalization of China's economy led to state owned enterprises being put into competition with private enterprise and, increasingly, foreign Multinational corporations. The "iron rice bowl", the policy of job security for large parts of the industrial workforce, continued to prevent work units from dismissing workers, while private enterprises were able to hire and fire workers as they saw fit. The decision by the central and provincial governments to offer tax and financial incentives to foreign investors in order to encourage them to invest in China led to further difficulties for the danwei system as the state run enterprises were increasingly unable to compete.

At the same time the role of the work unit has changed as China has moved from a socialist ideology to "Socialism with Chinese characteristics". By 2000 much of the work unit's power had been removed. In 2003, for example, it became possible to marry or divorce someone without needing authorization from one's work unit.

Background 
In the late 1950s, the Party-state gradually developed the danwei system as a way to organize and control urban areas. Some scholars believe that the social, economic, and political functions of the danwei could be traced back to the pre-communist financial institutions in the 1930s, the labor movement between the 1920s and 1940s, and the rural revolutionary models of organization in the Yan'an period. In addition, some scholars propose that Chinese state planners borrowed heavily from the Soviet model of development, or state socialism, in the design of party and state organs as well as the management of state enterprises. To accelerate the pace of industrialization and to create a new urban working class, the Chinese Communist Party looked up to the Soviet experience and translated thousands of Soviet enterprise management literature. The CCP used basic principles of industrial organization and management from the Soviet literature to draft its own industrial management system and create a new factory hierarchy of authority and administration. To follow the Soviet socialist economic model, which aimed to achieve full employment, the Chinese work unit system guaranteed permanent employment. This means that a factory could not easily fire its workers and the workers could not switch to another work unit unless they obtained special permissions.

See also

Dangan
Hukou system
People's commune
Production brigade
Production team (China)
Shequ, structural replacement for Danwei
Inminban

References

Bibliography 

 Bjorklund, E. M. “The Danwei: Socio-Spatial Characteristics of Work Units in China's Urban Society.” Economic Geography, vol. 62, no. 1, 1986, pp. 19–29. 
 Chai, Yanwei (2014-09-24). "From socialist danwei to new danwei: a daily-life-based framework for sustainable development in urban China". Asian Geographer. 
 "Danwei -Work Unit Urbanism | Model House". transculturalmodernism.org. Retrieved 2019-11-30.
 Danwei : the changing Chinese workplace in historical and comparative perspective. Lü, Xiaobo, 1959-, Perry, Elizabeth J. Armonk, N.Y.: M.E. Sharpe. 1997
 Lin, Kevin. "Work Unit.” Afterlives of Chinese Communism: Political Concepts from Mao to Xi, edited by Christian Sorace et al., ANU Press, Australia, 2019, pp. 331–334. 
 Kaple, Deborah A. (1994-01-06). Dream of a Red Factory: The Legacy of High Stalinism in China. Oxford University Press. 
 Walder, Andrew G. Communist Neo-Traditionalism: Work and Authority in Chinese Industry. University of California Press, 1986. 
 Whyte, Martin King and William L. Parish. Urban Life in Contemporary China. University of Chicago Press. 1984. 
 , 2000.

Society of China
Economic history of the People's Republic of China